Frida Elin Green (born 6 September 1992) is a Swedish singer. She reached the final of the Swedish version of Got Talent, Talang 2018.

Career
In 2015, Green contributed her vocals in Swedish group Badpojken's single "Johnny G (The Guidetti Song)", which reached number one on the Sverigetopplistan. In 2017, Green performed "O helga natt" during the SVT coverage of Saint Lucy's Day, Luciamorgon. Green appeared in the talent show Talang in 2018. In 2019, Green released her debut single, "Beat 'Em Up". Green released a single as a tribute to environmental activist Greta Thunberg titled "What Would Greta Do?". Green participated in Melodifestivalen 2021 with the song "The Silence", written by Anna Bergendahl, Bobby Ljunggren, David Lindgren Zacharias and Joy Deb. The song qualified for the Andra Chansen round, however lost to Paul Rey's song and was thus eliminated.

Discography

Singles

References

1992 births
Talang (Swedish TV series) contestants
Living people
People from Ystad
Swedish pop singers
21st-century Swedish singers
21st-century Swedish women singers
Melodifestivalen contestants of 2021